Findlay Airport  is  southwest of Findlay, in Hancock County, Ohio.

History

Lake Central Airlines scheduled flights to Findlay from 1961 until 1965-66. In the late 1960s, Northern Airlines provided commuter service to Findlay. The airline provided 6 weekday departures (fewer on weekends). Three of the flights were nonstop to Cleveland Hopkins International & three to Lima, OH, continuing to St. Mary's OH & Dayton.

Accidents and Incidents
 On December 10, 1963 a Douglas A-26 Invader stalled and crashed during a landing approach, killing 3 in the plane.

Facilities
It has two runways: 7/25 is 5,883 by 100 ft (1,793 x 30 m) and 18/36 is 6,499 by 100 ft (1,981 x 30 m). In the year ending August 14, 2015, the airport had 24,550 aircraft operations, average 67 per day: 98% general aviation, 2% air taxi and <1% military. In November 2016, 22 aircraft were based at the airport:  17 single-engine, 4 jet and 1 helicopter.

References

External links
 Airport page at City of Findlay website
 

Airports in Ohio
Buildings and structures in Hancock County, Ohio
Transportation in Hancock County, Ohio
Findlay, Ohio